The 2009 Women's Professional Soccer season served as the inaugural season for WPS, the top level professional women's soccer league in the United States. The regular season began on March 29 and ended on August 9, with the postseason being held between August 15 and 21.

Competition format

 The season began on March 29 and ended on August 9.
 Each team played a total of 20 games evenly divided between home and away games. Each team played every other team three times, either twice at home and once away or once at home and twice away, for a total of 18 games. The remaining two games were played against two other teams, one at home and one away.
 The four teams with the most points from the regular season qualified for the playoffs. The third- and fourth-placed regular season finishers played each other in the single-match First Round. The winner of the First Round then faced the second-placed regular season finisher in the Super Semifinal, and the winner faced the first-placed regular season finisher in the WPS Final.

Results table

Standings

Attendance

Average home attendances
Ranked from highest to lowest average attendance.

Playoffs

Leaders

 Last updated: August 4, 2009

Offense

Fouls

Goalkeeping

270+ MINS only

Awards

Player of the Week

Player of the Month

Statistics

Scoring
First Goal of the Season: Allison Falk for Los Angeles Sol against Washington Freedom, 6th minute (March 29)
Earliest Goal in a Match: 2 minutes
Kelly Smith for Boston Breakers against Los Angeles Sol (2 May)
Eniola Aluko for Saint Louis Athletica against Sky Blue FC (June 28)
Latest Goal in a Match: 93+ minutes
Jennifer Nobis for Boston Breakers against Sky Blue FC (July 12)
Widest Winning Margin: 4 goals
Chicago Red Stars 4–0 Boston Breakers (April 25)
Los Angeles Sol 4–0 Chicago Red Stars (June 27)
Most Goals Scored in a Match: 8
Sky Blue FC 4–4 Washington Freedom (April 26)
First Hat-Trick: Cristiane for Chicago Red Stars against FC Gold Pride (July 12))
Fastest Hat-Trick: 35 minutes
Cristiane for Chicago Red Stars against FC Gold Pride: 31' 46+' 65' (July 12)
First Own Goal: Ifeoma Dieke of Chicago Red Stars for Saint Louis Athletica (23 May)
Average Goals per match: 2.086

Discipline
First Yellow Card: Nikki Krzysik for Chicago Red Stars against Saint Louis Athletica, 90th minute (April 4)
First Red Card:  Frida Östberg for Chicago Red Stars against Washington Freedom, 63rd minute (April 11)
Most Yellow Cards: 4
Chioma Igwe (Chicago Red Stars)
Kia McNeill (Saint Louis Athletica)
Most Yellow Cards in a Match: 4
Boston Breakers 2–0 Saint Louis Athletica – 3 for Boston (Kasey Moore, Alex Scott, & Stacy Bishop) and 1 for St. Louis (Melissa Tancredi) (April 11)
Saint Louis Athletica 0–0 Los Angeles Sol – 2 for St. Louis (Kia McNeill & Daniela) and 2 for Los Angeles (Aya Miyama & Shannon Boxx) (April 25)
Los Angeles Sol 0–0 Boston Breakers – 2 for Los Angeles (Shannon Boxx & Camille Abily) and 2 for Boston (Angela Hucles & Nancy Augustyniak)
Washington Freedom 0–0 Chicago Red Stars – 2 for Washington (Abby Wambach & Sonia Bompastor) and 2 for Chicago (Brittany Klein & Megan Rapinoe) (June 13)
Chicago Red Stars 3–1 FC Gold Pride – 3 for Chicago (Lindsay Tarpley, Karen Carney, & Carli Lloyd) and 1 for Bay Area (Formiga) (July 12)

Streaks
Longest Winning Streak: 4 Games
Los Angeles Sol Games 13–16
Longest Unbeaten Streak: 11 games
Los Angeles Sol Games 6–16
Longest Winless Streak: 10 games
FC Gold Pride Games 8–17
Longest Losing Streak: 4 Games
FC Gold Pride Games 12–15
Longest Shutout: 361 minutes by Karina LeBlanc for Los Angeles Sol
Longest Drought: 451 minutes for Chicago Red Stars

Other Firsts
First player to score twice in a match: Marta for Los Angeles Sol against Sky Blue FC (April 5)
First come-from-behind victory: Chicago Red Stars 2–1 Washington Freedom (July 1)
First team to lose to all opponents: Chicago Red Stars with loss to Washington Freedom on July 26
The only other team to accomplish this was FC Gold Pride with loss to Sky Blue FC on August 5
First team to beat all opponents: Los Angeles Sol with win against Boston Breakers on August 9
The only other team to accomplish this was Sky Blue FC with win against Los Angeles Sol on August 22
First goalkeeper assist: Hope Solo (to Christie Welsh) for Saint Louis Athletica against FC Gold Pride on August 9

Home Team Record
(Regular season only)
 33 wins, 20 losses, 17 ties – 1.657 PPG
 87 goals for, 59 goals against – +28 GD

Related Competitions

All-Star Game 

WPS All-Star 2009 was played on August 30 at Soccer Park in the St. Louis suburb of Fenton, Missouri, with the WPS All-Stars defeating Swedish powerhouse Umeå IK of Damallsvenskan 4–2. The match was televised in the US on Fox Soccer Channel.

See also

 List of Women's Professional Soccer stadiums

References

External links
 Official Site

 
2009

1